Frances Frenaye (1908-1996) was an American translator of French and Italian literature. She translated work by writers including Balzac, Carlo Levi, Ignazio Silone and Elie Wiesel.

Works
 Natalia Ginzburg: The Road to the City (Ital.: La strada che va in città), 1942
 Ignazio Silone: The Seed Beneath the Snow (Ital.: Il seme sotto la neve), 1943
 Natalia Ginzburg: The Dry Heart (Ital.: È stato così), 1947
 Carlo Levi: Christ Stopped at Eboli (Ital.: Cristo si è fermato a Eboli), London, Cassell, 1948.
 Giovannino Guareschi: Don Camillo and the Prodigal Son (Ital.: Mondo Piccolo: Don Camillo e il suo gregge), Victor Gollancz, 1952
 Riccardo Bacchelli: The Mill on the Po (Ital.: Il mulino del Po), 1952
 Alberto Moravia: Bitter Honeymoon (Ital.: Luna di miele, sole di fiele), 1954
 Giovannino Guareschi: Don Camillo's Dilemma (Ital.: Il dilemma di Don Camillo), Victor Gollancz Ltd, 1954
 Anna Maria Ortese: The Bay is Not Naples (Ital.: Il mare non bagna Napoli), 1955
 Honoré de Balzac: César Birotteau, (Fr.: Histoire de la Grandeur et de la Décadence de César Birotteau), 1956
 Giovannino Guareschi: Don Camillo and the Devil (Ital.: Don Camillo e il diavolo), Victor Gollancz Ltd, 1957
 Françoise Sagan: Those Without Shadows (Fr.: Dans un mois, dans un an), 1957
 Daria Olivier: The Snows of December (Fr.: Les Neiges de décembre), 1959
 Elie Wiesel: Dawn (Fr.: L'aube), Hill and Wang, 1961 
 Armand Lanoux: Rendezvous at Bruges (Fr.: Le Rendezvous de Bruges), 1961
 Dacia Maraini: The Age of Discontent (Ital.: L'età del malessere), 1963
 Giovannino Guareschi: Comrade Don Camillo (Ital.: Il compagno Don Camillo), Victor Gollancz Ltd, 1964
 Elie Wiesel: The Gates of the Forest (Fr.: Le Portes del la forêt), Holt, Rinehart and Winston, 1966
 Elio Vittorini: Women of Messina (Ital.: Le donne di Messina), 1973
 Giuseppe Dessì: The forests of Norbio (Ital.: Paese d'ombre: Romanzo), Harcourt Brace Jovanovich, 1975: winner of the 1976 John Florio Prize
 Antonio Tabucchi: Little Misunderstandings of No Importance (Ital.: Piccoli equivoci senza importanza), 1985

References

1908 births
1996 deaths
French–English translators
Italian–English translators
20th-century American translators
20th-century American women writers